Mayor of Elizabeth, New Jersey:

J. Christian Bollwage 1992 to present
Thomas Gerard Dunn (1921–1998) 1964 to 1992. He was the nation's longest-serving mayor of a city of more than 100,000 people.
Steven J. Bercik (?-2003) 1956 to 1964.
Nicholas Saint LaCorte (1919–1966) 1953-1955.
James T. Kirk (mayor) (1896–1974) 1939-1952.
Joseph A. Brophy 1935-1939
Thomas Williams (mayor) 1933-1935
John F. Kenah 1922-1932
Victor Mravlag		1913-1923
Alfred A. Stein		1911-1913
Victor Mravlag		1909-1911
Patrick J. Ryan (mayor)		1907-1909
Samuel J. Berry		1905-1907
Patrick J. Ryan (mayor)		1901-1905
William A.M. Mack	(1857–1901) 1898 - January 14, 1901. He died in office.
John C. Rankin, Jr. 1890-1898
Joseph H. Grier January 1, 1883 to 1890
Seth B. Ryder January 1, 1882 to January 1, 1883.
Peter Bennett (mayor) January 1, 1880 to January 1, 1882.
Robert W. Townley January 1, 1879, to January 1, 1880.
James S. Green (mayor) January 1, 1878 to January 1, 1879.
Robert W. Townley January 1, 1875 to January 1, 1878.
William A. Coursen January 1, 1873 to January 1, 1875.
Francis Barber Chetwood II January 1, 1871 to January 1, 1873.
Philip H. Grier May 1, 1862 to January 1, 1871.
James B. Burnet May 1, 1861 to May 1, 1862.
James Jenkins (mayor) May 1, 1860 to May 1, 1861.
Elias Darby May 1, 1855 to May 1, 1860. He was the first mayor of the newly incorporated city of Elizabeth, New Jersey.
Elias Darby 1853 to May 1, 1855. He was the last mayor of Elizabethtown.
Francis Barber Chetwood 1851 to 1853.
Edward Sanderson 1847 to 1851.
Francis Barber Chetwood 1846 to 1847.
Elias Winans 1845 to 1846.
David Naar		1842-1845
William Chetwood (1771–1857) 1839 to 1842.
Smith Scudder 1838 to 1839.
Stephan P. Brittan 1833 to 1838.
Isaac Halstead Williamson (1768–1844) 1830 to 1833. He died in office.
Caleb Halsted, Jr.	1825-1830
 Unknown 1823 to 1825
Jeremiah Ballard	1822 - 4 Sep 1823. He died in office.
Caleb Halsted, Jr.	1805-1822
Elias Dayton		1795-1805
John De Hart (1727–1795) 1789 to June 1, 1795. He died in office.
Samuel Crane (mayor)		1788-1789
 From 1776 to 1788 there was no representative
William Peartree Smith	1774-1776
Stephen Crane		1772-1774
John De Hart		1762-1772
Samuel Woodruff		1748-1762
Joseph Bonnell (mayor)		1739 - 14 March 1748. He died in office.

References

 
1739 establishments in New Jersey